The name Bagabag may refer to:
 
 Bagabag, Nueva Vizcaya, a 3rd class municipality in the province of Nueva Vizcaya, Philippines
 Bagabag (Papua New Guinea), an island in the Madang-Province of Papua New Guinea